W. F. DeWitt Hotel is a historic hotel located at Durham in Greene County, New York.  It was built about 1865, and is a 2 1/2-story, seven bay by three bay, frame building in the Italianate style.  It rests on a stone foundation and has a moderately pitched gable roof. As of 2013, it was operating as an antiques store.

It was listed on the National Register of Historic Places in 2001.

See also
National Register of Historic Places listings in Greene County, New York

References

Hotel buildings on the National Register of Historic Places in New York (state)
Hotel buildings completed in 1865
Italianate architecture in New York (state)
Buildings and structures in Greene County, New York
National Register of Historic Places in Greene County, New York